is a Japanese actor and model who is represented by the talent agency Ken-On. He graduated from Horikoshi High School.

Biography
Yamamoto is a football student and he is the goalie. In his junior high school he was elected to be one of the representative players of Nara.

In 2009, Yamamoto was submitted by his mother to the Mitsubishi Pencil Style Fit Boy Contest and won among 1,500 people. He later became a finalist in the 22nd Junon Super Boy Contest.  Yamamoto became one of the members of Ken-On's project Ken-On Nikutai Kaizō-bu and appeared in the event Men-On Style in 2012.

In the summer of 2013, he was elected in the nationwide audition for Fuji Television's United States of Odaiba and was placed in charge of Orange.  Yamamoto passed the 29th Men's Non-no Model audition. He became an exclusive model of Men's Non-no.

Yamamoto competed twice in the Obstacle Course contest program Sasuke, however he never completed the First Stage.  He was disqualified in the 2014 tournament after failing the Jump Hang Kai and from the 2015 tournament after failing the Orugōru (also known as the Music Box) before he could reach the Jump Hang Kai again.

In 2015, Yamamoto made regular appearances as Makoto Fukami/Kamen Rider Specter in Kamen Rider Ghost

Filmography

TV series

Filmography

References

External links
  
 Official profile 
 Profile at Men's Non-no 

Japanese male models
1995 births
Living people
Models from Nara Prefecture
Ken-On artists
Actors from Nara Prefecture
Horikoshi High School alumni
21st-century Japanese male actors